Emil Gabriel Jula (3 January 1980 – 22 August 2020) was a Romanian professional footballer who played as a striker.

Career
In January 2013, he joined VfL Osnabrück. He scored two goals during a match against Hansa Rostock, which ended 3–2 for Osnabrück.

Death
He died on 22 August 2020, aged 40.

References

External links
 
 
 

1980 births
2020 deaths
Sportspeople from Cluj-Napoca
Romanian footballers
Association football forwards
Liga I players
Liga II players
Bundesliga players
2. Bundesliga players
3. Liga players
Cypriot First Division players
Place of death missing
FC Universitatea Cluj players
ASC Oțelul Galați players
FC Energie Cottbus players
MSV Duisburg players
Anorthosis Famagusta F.C. players
VfL Osnabrück players
CSM Ceahlăul Piatra Neamț players
Romanian expatriate footballers
Romanian expatriate sportspeople in Germany
Expatriate footballers in Germany
Romanian expatriate sportspeople in Cyprus
Expatriate footballers in Cyprus